Arthur Prince (8 December 1902 – 1980) was an English footballer who played on the left-wing in the Football League for Port Vale, Sheffield Wednesday, Hull City, Walsall, and Bristol Rovers. He helped Wednesday to win the Second Division title in 1925–26.

Career
Prince played for Bucknall, before joining Port Vale as an amateur in October 1922, and signing as a professional player in January 1923. He made 16 Second Division appearances in the 1922–23 season, and scored his first senior goal in a 2–1 defeat to Bradford City at The Old Recreation Ground on 3 March. He played 27 league games in the 1923–24 campaign. He was sold to Sheffield Wednesday for a £750 fee in May 1924. The "Owls" finished 14th in the Second Division in 1924–25, before winning promotion as champions in 1925–26. The Hillsborough club went on to post 16th and 14th-place finishes in the First Division in 1926–27 and 1927–28. He later turned out for Hull City, Walsall and Bristol Rovers.

Career statistics
Source:

Honours
Sheffield Wednesday
Football League Second Division: 1925–26

References

People from Bucknall, Staffordshire
English footballers
Association football wingers
Port Vale F.C. players
Sheffield Wednesday F.C. players
Hull City A.F.C. players
Walsall F.C. players
Bristol Rovers F.C. players
English Football League players
1902 births
1980 deaths